La Candelaria is the 17th locality of Bogotá, Colombia. A historic neighborhood in the city's downtown, it is the equivalent to the Old City in other cities. The architecture of the old houses, churches and buildings has Spanish Colonial, Baroque and art deco styles. It houses several universities, libraries and museums.

It is made up of the neighborhoods La Catedral, La Concordia, Las Aguas, Centro Administrativo, Egipto, Belén, San Francisco Rural, Nueva Santa Fe and Santa Bárbara. The city was founded there on August 6, 1538 and the first church was built, this town encompasses the historic center of Bogotá, as well as an important tourist, educational and commercial center.

History
Teusaquillo (today Chorro de Quevedo) was a resting place for the Muisca ruler called Zipa. It is believed that in this place Gonzalo Jiménez de Quesada founded, on August 6, 1538, what would become the City of Bogotá. The town takes its name from the colonial Church of Nuestra Señora de la Candelaria.

In April 1539, the formal foundation was developed in the current Plaza de Bolívar. There, the original layout of the city is made, establishing the Plaza Mayor and the place of the Parish of San Pedro, which would later become the 
Metropolitan Basilica Cathedral of Bogotá and Primate of Colombia.

In the city, it grew to the north (Plaza de las Hierbas), south (Las Cruces) and west (San Victorino), leaving the Plaza Mayor and the Cathedral as the traditional center of the city and seat of the colonial and later republican powers. This is how the city was divided into four parishes during the 18th and 19th centuries: San Pedro, Nuestra Señora de las Nieves, San Victorino and Santa Bárbara. The Parish of San Pedro coincided with the current locality of La Candelaria, which in turn was made up of the el Príncipe, San Jorge, el Palacio and la Catedral. neighborhoods.

Created the Special District of Bogotá in 1955 there was no major difference between the Center of Bogotá (or simply Bogotá in the speaking of that time) and the historic center. In the 1970s, la Candelaria corporation was created to rescue the historical heritage of the neighborhoods of La Catedral, La Concordia and La Candelaria.

Through Agreement 7 of December 4, 1974, the Council of Bogotá created the Minor Mayor's Office of La Candelaria, this would lead to its being recognized in 1991 as one of the 20 localities of the Capital District of Bogotá to elect its Local Administrative Board for the first time. (JAL).

Attractions 
In La Candelaria is the site of the formal foundation of the city, the Plaza Mayor known today as Plaza de Bolívar. Around it are the Capitolio Nacional (seat of the Congress of Colombia), the Palace of Justice (seat of the Supreme Court of Justice), the Palacio Liévano (seat of the Mayor's Office of Bogotá), the Primatial Cathedral of Bogotá, the Chapel del Sagrario and the Archbishop's Palace (seat of the Archbishop "Cardinal seat").

In addition to the Capitolio and the Palace of Justice, other important seats of national power located in the place are the Casa de Nariño (seat of the Presidency of the Republic and presidential residence), and the Palacio de San Carlos (seat of the Chancellery or Ministry of International Relations).

Among the museums, the Museums and Collections of the Bank of the Republic (Mint House, Museo Botero and Art Museum of the Bank of the Republic), Casa del Florero, the Museum of Colonial Art, the Archaeological Museum House of the Marquis of San Jorge, the Military Museum, the Regional Costume Museum (Manuelita Sáenz's house), the Museo de Bogotá, the National Police Museum.

Among the cultural centers are the Luis Ángel Arango Library, which in addition to having reading rooms, offers daily conferences that cover all sciences, as well as being the site of important art exhibitions. There is also the Gabriel García Márquez Cultural Center, the Gilberto Alzate Avendaño Foundation and the birthplace of Rafael Pombo.

Among its churches, parishes, rectories and sanctuaries, it is worth mentioning the Primatial Cathedral of Bogotá, the Chapel del Sagrario, the Santa Clara Church Museum, the National Sanctuary of Nuestra Señora del Carmen, the San Ignacio Church, the Church of San Agustín, the Ermita del San Miguel del Príncipe, the Parish of Nuestra Señora de Belén, the Church of Nuestra Señora de Las Aguas, the Church of Nuestra Señora de la Candelaria and the Church of Santa Bárbara.

Several universities have their headquarters in this town, among which Los Andes, La Salle, Del Rosario, la Gran Colombia, Externado, Free University, the Autonomous, America, the Central, National Unified Corporation for Higher Education, Jorge Tadeo Lozano University, Francisco José de Caldas District University and the Colegio Mayor de San Bartolomé stand out.

Other sites of interest include:

 Calle del Embudo - The narrow, cobblestoned street gets its name from its shape. Embudo translates to "funnel" in English; the street is shaped like a funnel. It is one of the most colourful streets in the historic La Candelaria district and leads to the Plaza del Chorro de Quevedo. Many walls on Calle del Embudo are painted with street art or graffiti, in the bright colours of Colombia. Some of them depict legends from the pre-Columbian era. 
 Plaza del Chorro de Quevedo - It is believed that the Spanish conquistador Gonzalo Jiménez de Quesada established the capital city of Bogotá on this square on August 6, 1538. The square takes its name from an Augustinian priest, Friar Quevedo, who in 1832 purchased the site and set up the public water fountain in the centre. Its water supply was cut off when a nearby building collapsed in 1896. It is also believed that it was from this site that the zipa, the main cacique of the Muisca, viewed the Bogotá savanna. Today, with all the buildings that surround the square, no such view is available.

 Botero Museum, located on Carrera 11, contains works by painter/sculptor Fernando Botero as well as works by artists including Monet and Picasso from Botero's private collection.
 Luis Angel Arango Library is the most important library of Colombia, property of the Republic Bank; has more than 1.1 million books and is the most visited public library in Latin America, has facilities of parking, cafeteria, museums, concert hall, and exposition areas. you need coins to leave your bag in the checkroom.
 Gold Museum is one of the most important museums of Colombia, It has a collection of more than 36,000 pieces in gold, wood, shell and stone organized in its three floors; the museum is property of the Republic Bank and is located in front of Santander Park.
 Monserrate is the symbol by excellence of the Colombian capital. The hill is a pilgrim destination, as well as a tourist attraction. In addition to the church, there is a restaurant. Monserrate can be accessed by aerial tramway, a funicular or by climbing, the preferred way of pilgrims. You can see it from nearly every point in Bogota.
La Puerta Falsa is a 200-year-old shop specializing in chocolate and tamales. It is located right next to the presidential palace.
 Silva Poetry House
 Bogotá Urban Development Museum
 Military Museum
 Rafael Pombo Poetry House
 Avianca Building
 Camarín del Carmen theater
 Quevedo brook plaza (Plaza del Chorro de Quevedo)
 Bolívar Square

Churches 
 Primada Cathedral
 San Francisco Church
 San Agustín Church
 Del Carmen Church

Universities 
 University of the Andes
 Our Lady of the Rosary University
 La Salle University
 Universidad Externado de Colombia
 La Gran Colombia University
 Unified National Corporation of Higher Education (CUN)

References

External links 

 Info at bogota-dc.com
 More Candelaria pictures
 La Candelaria videos and Information

Landmarks in Colombia
Localities of Bogotá
Tourist attractions in Bogotá